The CERN Open Hardware Licence (OHL or CERN OHL) is a license used in open-source hardware projects. It was created by CERN, which published version 1.0 in March 2011. Version 1.1 was published in July 2011. Version 1.2 was published in September 2013. Version 2.0, which utilizes a simplified language and covers also integrated circuit designs, was published in March 2020.

Wording 
Contrary to most license names, the CERN OHL uses the British English spelling licence rather than the American English spelling license which contains an "s".

Projects using the CERN OHL 

On the CERN OHL website they have a list of projects using their license. These projects include:
 Most projects in the Open Hardware Repository OHR
 AXIOM – digital cinema camera
 Gizmo For You Ltd
 Mechanical Ventilator Milano Rapid production ventilator design as an answer to COVID-19 shortage
 The Monero Hardware Wallet The first (licensed schematic and layout) Monero hardware wallet
 Mycroft Mark I – smart speaker with open-source digital assistant (design files available here)
 ScopeFun open source oscilloscope
 SimpleMachines
 SatNOGS-the open satellite ground station network 
 The synchrotron instrumentation PandAbox which chorographs experiments at particle accelerator and other facilities
 Tinkerforge Bricks and Bricklets
 The tristimulus colorimeter Colorhug2  uses version 1.1 of this license.
 UPSat-the first open hardware satellite 1
 A Free Beer variation, brewed for the RMLL 2012 and recipe placed under the CERN OHL 1.1
 OpenScout an open source hardware mobile robot

Reception 
The CERN OHL is an accepted free content license according to the Free Cultural Works definition 
and version 2 is approved by the Open Source Initiative.

See also 
 Open-source hardware
 Open content

References

External links 
 CERN Open Hardware Licence

Open hardware licenses
CERN